Albert Steiner (1877–1965) was a 20th-century Swiss landscape photographer. [Steiner] was one of Switzerland's outstanding 20th-century photographers. His landscape photographs taken in the Engadine, where he lived and worked for 46 years, are unique on an international as well as a national level. They have had a major influence on an awareness of Switzerland as an unspoiled alpine country of surpassing beauty. Inspired by painters such as Giovanni Segantini and Ferdinand Hodler, Steiner took pictures that reveal a profound respect for and love of nature, as well as a tireless search for timeless beauty and metaphysical truth. His meticulously structured, light-saturated compositions are expressive witnesses of his experience of human insignificance in the face of the greatness and sublimity of the mountain world. Surprisingly, up until now Steiner's work has not been accorded the appreciation it deserves.

Reference list

1877 births
1965 deaths
Swiss photographers